The 2023 Las Anod conflict is an ongoing bilateral armed conflict between militias of the Dhulbahante clan and Somaliland National Army that ensued in the capital of the Sool region. Fighting erupted on February 6 after Somaliland security forces held a violent crackdown on civil protests. On February 8, the supreme Garad of Dhulbahante, Garad Jama Garad Ali, declared an intent to secede and reunite with the Federal Government of Somalia.

The conflict has killed 145+ people and displaced 100,000 refugees, either externally to Buuhodle and the Ethiopian border or internally to Garowe in Puntland. On March 16, Somaliland troops were reported to be shelling civilians from the surrounding area.

Background
Las Anod had been controlled by Somaliland since 2007, who ousted the Puntland army from the regional capital in 2007 with local militia support. The clan militias supporting Somaliland were loyal to Ahmed Abdi Habsade, a Puntland minister who defected to Somaliland and then returned to Puntland. In particular, the security situation reported to have severely declined under Somaliland's control. The Raad Peace Research Institute in Mogadishu reported that "120 prominent clan and community leaders were assassinated" between 2007 and 2022 in the city proper.

In December 2022, civil demonstration and unrest began to spread northwest across the Sool region, from Taleex to Kalabaydh, Xudun, Boocame and Tukaraq, driven by percieved political marginalization in Somaliland. The protests were triggered by the death of Abdifatah Abdulli Hadrawi, a popular politician in the Waddani opposition party. When the mass civil demonstration reached Las Anod, Somaliland security forces held a violent crackdown on the protestors in the final week of December 2022 which killed 20 people. Following bilateral talks, Somaliland troops retreated from the city to their Sool outposts to prevent further violence.

Clashes

After mass protests continuing from December into January 2023, the retreat of the Somaliland troops paved the way for the return of the exiled supreme Garad of Dhulbahante, Garad Jama Garad Ali. Rumor spread of a grand meeting of all Dhulbahante clan elders, followed by speculation that the elders would vote to exile Somaliland security forces from the city. On February 6, 2023, the Dhulbahante clan elders declared their intent to form a state government named "SSC-Khatumo" within the Federal Government of Somalia. Fighting broke out earlier on the same day in Las Anod between Somaliland troops and Dhulbahante militias in the Sayadka Hill suburb (reportedly home to two committee members), with shots heard in the streets surrounding Hamd Hotel where Somaliland dignitaries were staying.

On February 8, the supreme Garad of Dhulbahante, Garad Jama Garad Ali, accused the Somaliland government of genocide, called for peace and declared Las Anod's intent to be governed from Mogadishu under the Federal Government of Somalia. Within the same week of February, fighting and civilian bombardments had killed at least 82 people in total and displaced 90% of the residents. The region had produced 185,000 internally displaced people and 60,000 refugees in February. On March 2, the mayor of Las Anod reported that Somaliland forces were bombing public buildings from the surrounding countryside including government institutions and hospitals. The UN also reported a casualty count of over 200 deaths.

See also

 Battle of Tukaraq
 Battle of Las Anod
 2010 Ayn Clashes

References

2023 in Somalia
2023 in Somaliland
February 2023 events in Africa
Conflicts in 2023
2023 conflict
Sool, Somaliland